is a Japanese politician of the Democratic Party of Japan, a member of the House of Councillors in the Diet (national legislature). A native of Osaka Prefecture, she graduated from the University of Toronto in Ontario, Canada and gained a bachelor's degree in developmental biology. She was elected to the House of Councillors for the first time in 2007. She is president of Shigakkan University.

Notes

References

External links 
  in Japanese.

1954 births
Living people
Members of the House of Councillors (Japan)
Female members of the House of Councillors (Japan)
University of Toronto alumni
People from Osaka
Democratic Party of Japan politicians
Presidents of universities and colleges in Japan
Women heads of universities and colleges
21st-century Japanese women politicians
21st-century Japanese politicians